Contessa Marina Cicogna (born 29 May 1934) is an Italian film producer and photographer. She produced the film Belle de Jour, which won the Golden Lion at the Venice Film Festival in 1967.

Personal life

Cicogna was born in Rome and grew up in Milan, Venice, and Cortina. She was the daughter of a banker, and her grandfather was Giuseppe Volpi, an influential figure in Italy's history; one of the country's richest men, he held many government posts and founded the Venice Film Festival.

Cicogna attended Sarah Lawrence College in New York, staying less than a year. While there, she befriended the daughter of Jack L. Warner; this connection facilitated Cicogna's introduction to other actors in Hollywood. She studied photography at another school in the United States, and took pictures of Hollywood friends including Marilyn Monroe and Greta Garbo. The black and white photographs were later published in a book.

For 20 years her life partner was the actress Florinda Bolkan.

Career

At the age of 32, Cicogna decided to pursue a career in the film industry. Her mother bought a share in a film distribution company, and Cicogna suggested films for the business to purchase. She distributed the West German film Helga, which she describes as the first time a birth was shown on screen. She publicized it by placing "ambulances at the exit of the film, saying that people would faint when they saw that".

The New York Times describes her as "the first major female Italian film producer" and "one of the most powerful women in European cinema". One of her film's, Belle de Jour, won the Golden Lion at the 1967 Venice Film Festival. She also produced such films as Once Upon a Time in the West, Investigation of a Citizen Above Suspicion, and Brother Sun, Sister Moon.

Her interest in photography led to the publication of two books, one of them displaying images of her family's 18th-century home in Tripoli.

References

External links

 

1934 births
Living people
Italian countesses
Italian nobility
20th-century Italian photographers
20th-century Italian women artists
20th-century women photographers
Italian film producers
Photographers from Rome
Italian women film producers
Italian women photographers
Nastro d'Argento winners
Lesbian photographers
LGBT film producers
Italian lesbian artists
Italian LGBT photographers